Beejan Land (born 14 February in Paddington, New South Wales, Australia) is an Australian actor and playwright. He graduated from National Institute of Dramatic Art and Newtown High School of the Performing Arts

Beejan also trained at the L'École Internationale de Théâtre Jacques Lecoq. Beejan is also a graduate of ACTT's Talented Young Actors' Program, National Institute of Dramatic Art Acting and Playwrighting programs. He also trained at Australian Theatre for Young People.

Early performing life 
Beejan was born in Sydney Australia and is of Iranian/Persian origins. He started his performing career as a young magician. Performing at events and parties he quickly began to develop a name as a magician. In 1998 he was awarded first place Australian Convention of Magicians competition in the Walk on Walk off Section. He then began taking after school acting classes at the Australian Theatre for Young People in 1999. He took classes in Film, Theatre and Voice as well as master classes with other industry professionals.  He performed in many productions with them giving him the experience and desire to continue his passions in the field of theatre and film. Mentors at Australian Theatre for Young People included Nick Enright, Victoria Longley, Kate Champion and David Berthold.

Early career
Beejan's acting debut really came around when he set up ROAR Theatre Company in 2004. An independent theatre company with a drive to combine emerging artists with established professionals in order enhance and develop and Australian voice. A co-production with Darlinghurst Theatre saw him produce and act in a production of Vicious Streaks by Alex Broun he asked Mad Max Beyond Thunderdome director George Ogilvie to direct along with then emerging director Lee Lewis. The production also featured Peter Mochrie and Jacinta John. The same year he was named Australia's Youngest theatre producers, He also won the Sydney Theatre Company's Young Playwrights Award.

Career
Beejan was asked by the Melbourne Theatre Company to perform in their main-stage production of The History Boys written by Alan Bennett and directed by Peter Evans. The production played a sold out season at The Arts Centre. The production featured other Australian actors such as Matthew Newton, Ashley Zukerman and Ben Geurens.

Beejan has performed in stage plays by William Shakespeare, Michael Gow, David Hare, Bertold Brecht, Debra Oswald, Ned Manning, Cyril Tourneur, Thomas Middleton, Alfred Jarry, Alex Broun, Mark Ravenhill, Tommy Murphy, Nazım Hikmet Ran, Frank Marcus, Alan Bennett, Tony Kushner and José Rivera

In 2004 he co-starred in The Black Balloon director Elissa Down's Tropfest short film Summer Angst. He also guest starred in an episode of the Australian medical drama series All Saints (TV series)

In 2005 he toured to Northern Ireland performing in Debra Oswald's Skate at the Belfast Festival at Queens.

As a Playwright his own plays have been performed by Griffin Theatre Company, Sydney Theatre Company and Tamarama Rock Surfers.

2008 saw Beejan join Wayne Hope, Kym Gyngell and the cast of Australian comedy series Very Small Business (TV series) as Taxation Officer, Lynton McGyver

In 2009 he joined the world-famous theatre troupe LeThéâtre du Soleil to continue his research and experience in the theatrical arts.

After a forceful nudge by world-renowned Theatre director Ariane Mnouchkine Beejan decided to undertake further studies at L'École Internationale de Théâtre Jacques Lecoq at the same time as creating a new work with the Théâtre du Soleil. Beejan has since been with the company.

Filmography

Theatre

Awards and nominations

References

External links

1989 births
Living people
Male actors from Sydney
Australian dramatists and playwrights
Australian people of Turkish descent
Australian people of Iranian descent
Australian male film actors
Australian male stage actors
Australian male television actors
Writers from Sydney
L'École Internationale de Théâtre Jacques Lecoq alumni